Ali Isaevich Isaev (born 18 December 1983 in Makhachkala, Soviet Union) is a Russian-Azerbaijani professional mixed martial artist and former amateur wrestler. He currently competes in the Heavyweight division of Bellator MMA. He has also formely compe ted for Fight Nights Global and Professional Fighters League (PFL), where he was the 2019 Heavyweight Tournament Champion. He competed at the 2008 Summer Olympics in men's freestyle wrestling at 125 kilos where Isaev placed 17th.

Mixed martial arts career

Early career
Ali Isaev was born to a Dargin family on 18 December 1983 in the city Makhatchkala. Isaev is a Freestyle wrestling European champion. He made his professional MMA debut in April 2016. He fought his first four fights exclusively for Fight Nights Global and went undefeated with two decision wins and two knockout wins.

Professional Fighters League

PFL season 2019 
In the summer of 2019, Isaev began competing in the Heavyweight division of the Professional Fighters League. In his debut, he defeated Valdrin Istrefi by unanimous decision at PFL 3 on June 6, 2019. In his second fight for the promotion, Isayev defeated Carl Seumanutafa also by unanimous decision at PFL 6 on August 8, 2019.

On October 31, 2019, he fought twice in one night in the 2019 PFL Heavyweight tournament. He defeated Kelvin Tiller by decision and Denis Goltsov by TKO in the quarterfinal and semifinal bouts, respectively. He faced Jared Rosholt in the finals at PFL 10 on December 31, 2019. Isayev won the fight via TKO in the fourth round to claim the 2019 Heavyweight Championship.

PFL season 2021 
Isaev was scheduled to face promotional newcomer Hatef Moeil on May 6, 2021 at PFL 3. However, during the week of the event, it was announced that the bout was pulled due to unknown reasons and would be rescheduled for June.

Isaev was scheduled to face Renan Ferreira on June 25, 2021 at PFL 6. Isaev was forced to withdraw from the event after not being medically cleared to compete. Stepping in for Isaev to fight Renan Ferreira was PFL newcomer Stuart Austin.

PFL season 2022 
Isaev was scheduled to face Klidson Abreu on April 28, 2022 at PFL 2. However, Isaev pulled out of the bout and was replaced by Adam Keresh.

Isaev was scheduled to face Jamelle Jones on June 24, 2022 at PFL 5. However, Isaev once again pulled out of the bout.

Bellator MMA 
On September 30, 2022, it was announced that Isaev had signed a multi-fight deal with Bellator MMA.

Isaev made his Bellator debut against Steve Mowry on February 4, 2023, at Bellator 290. The bout concluded in an unanimous draw.

Championships and accomplishments
Professional Fighters League
2019 Heavyweight Championship

Mixed martial arts record

|-
|Draw
|align=center|9–0–1 
|Steve Mowry
|Draw (unanimous)
|Bellator 290
|
|align=center|3
|align=center|5:00
|Inglewood, California, United States
|
|-
|Win
|align=center|9–0 
|Jared Rosholt
|TKO (punches)
|PFL 10
|
|align=center|4
|align=center|4:09
|New York City, New York, United States
|.
|-
|Win
|align=center|8–0 
|Denis Goltsov	
|TKO (punches)
|rowspan=2 | PFL 9
|rowspan=2 | 
|align=center| 3
|align=center| 4:59
|rowspan=2 | Las Vegas, Nevada, United States
|
|-
|Win
|align=center|7–0 
|Kelvin Tiller
|Decision (unanimous)
|align=center|2
|align=center|5:00
|
|-
|Win
|align=center|6–0 
|Carl Seumanutafa
|Decision (unanimous)
|PFL 6
|
|align=center| 3
|align=center| 5:00
|Atlantic City, New Jersey, United States
| 
|-
| Win
| align=center| 5–0
| Valdrin Istrefi
| Decision (unanimous)
| PFL 3
| 
| align=center| 3
| align=center| 5:00
| Uniondale, New York, U.S.
| 
|-
| Win
| align=center| 4–0
| Alexander Gladkov
| KO (spinning wheel Kick and punches)
| Fight Nights Global 90: Mineev vs. Ismailov
| 
| align=center| 1
| align=center| 1:36
| Moscow, Russia
| 
|-
| Win
| align=center| 3–0
| Vladimir Daineko
| TKO (punches)
| Fight Nights Global 83: Alibekov vs. Aliev
| 
| align=center| 2
| align=center| 0:40
| Moscow, Russia
| 
|-
| Win
| align=center| 2–0
| Mikhail Kabargin
| Decision (unanimous)
| Fight Nights Global 53: Day 1 - Gimbatov vs. Shokalo
| 
| align=center| 3
| align=center| 5:00
| Moscow, Russia
| 
|-
| Win
| align=center| 1–0
| Timofey Mishev
| Decision (unanimous)
| Fight Nights Global 46: Mokhnatkin vs. Kudin
| 
| align=center| 3
| align=center| 5:00
| Moscow, Russia
|

Freestyle record

See also
List of current Bellator MMA fighters
List of male mixed martial artists

References

 Wrestler bio on FILAwrestling.com

External links
 Ali Isaev at PFL
 Ali Isaev at 
 

1983 births
Living people
Azerbaijani male mixed martial artists
Mixed martial artists utilizing freestyle wrestling
Olympic wrestlers of Azerbaijan
Wrestlers at the 2008 Summer Olympics
European Wrestling Championships medalists
Azerbaijani male sport wrestlers
Sportspeople from Makhachkala